Sir Augustus Frederick d'Este, KCH (13 January 1794 – 28 December 1848) was a relative of the British royal family and the earliest recorded person for whom a definite diagnosis of multiple sclerosis can be made. He was the only son of Prince Augustus Frederick, Duke of Sussex, and his wife Lady Augusta Murray. He was a grandson of King George III, nephew of Kings George IV and William IV, and a first cousin to Queen Victoria.

Family and career 
D'Este was the son of Prince Augustus Frederick, Duke of Sussex, and Lady Augusta Murray, and a grandson of King George III. His parents were secretly married on 4 April 1793, in a Church of England ceremony in Rome at the Hotel Sarmiento, and later married again on 5 December 1793 at St George's, Hanover Square, Westminster, using their correct names but without revealing their identities. Both marriages were in defiance of the Royal Marriages Act 1772 and were thus legally null and void, at least in English law. After the birth of their first child, the marriage was discovered by the King and formally annulled, making their son illegitimate in Great Britain. Christened "Augustus Frederick", he was briefly given the surname of "Hanover", but later took the name of d'Este, a family from which both his parents were descended. He attended Harrow School.

An active member of the Aborigines Protection Society particularly interested in Native Americans, d'Este gave considerable assistance to Peter Jones, the Mississauga missionary and leader, who argued for Native Americans to have title to their lands in Upper Canada.

When his father died in 1843, Sir Augustus d’Este attempted to claim his dukedom of Sussex and other peerages, but the House of Lords decided against his claim, as the prince's marriage had been null and void. Although he had affairs with women, he never married and, therefore, even if he had succeeded to his father's titles, they would have become extinct on his own death.

Illness
Augustus d'Este is the earliest recorded person for whom a definite diagnosis of multiple sclerosis can be made. The course of his MS, which was not diagnosed during his lifetime, is known from the diaries he kept. D'Este left a detailed diary describing his 22 years living with the disease. He began his diary in 1822 and it had its last entry in 1846; only to remain unknown until 1948. His symptoms began at age 28, with a sudden transient visual loss after the funeral of a friend. During the course of his disease he developed weakness of the legs, clumsiness of the hands, numbness, dizziness, bladder disturbances, and erectile dysfunction. By 1843 he was experiencing persistent symptoms including tremor and nocturnal spasms, and in 1844 he began to use a wheelchair. In his last years he was confined to his bed. Despite his illness, he kept an optimistic view of life.

Ancestry

References

1794 births
1848 deaths
Augustus D'Este
Deaths from multiple sclerosis
Neurological disease deaths in England
Equerries
Illegitimate children of British princes
Knights Bachelor
People educated at Harrow School
Royalty and nobility with disabilities
People with multiple sclerosis